The name Dolly has been used for twelve tropical cyclones worldwide.

In the Atlantic Ocean:
Hurricane Dolly (1953) – strong hurricane that weakened rapidly before passing over Bermuda
Hurricane Dolly (1954) – stayed far from land
Hurricane Dolly (1968) – moved up the east coast of the United States but did not make landfall
Tropical Storm Dolly (1974) – did not strike land
Hurricane Dolly (1996) – made landfall at Quintana Roo, Mexico and again at Tamaulipas, Mexico
Tropical Storm Dolly (2002) – never threatened land.
Hurricane Dolly (2008) – Category 2 hurricane that caused $1.5 billion in damage to Texas and Mexico
Tropical Storm Dolly (2014) – made landfall in Mexico.
Tropical Storm Dolly (2020) – formed off the coast of the United States as a subtropical depression

In the Western Pacific Ocean:
Typhoon Dolly (1946) – made landfall in China's Zhejiang province

In the South-East Indian Ocean:
Tropical Cyclone Dolly (1965) – never impacted land

In the South-West Indian Ocean:
Tropical Storm Dolly (1972) – developed off the coast of Madagascar that later grazed Réunion

Atlantic hurricane set index articles
Pacific typhoon set index articles
Australian region cyclone set index articles
South-West Indian Ocean cyclone set index articles